Paul W. Holland is an American statistician. He has worked on a wide range of fields including: categorical data analysis, social network analysis and causal inference in program evaluation.

Paul Holland was born 25 April 1940 in Tulsa, Oklahoma. He went to the University of Michigan as an undergraduate, and Stanford University for the master's and doctorate in statistics. Michigan State University and Harvard University were his first teaching posts. He started at Educational Testing Service in 1975. From 1993 to 2000 he taught at University of California, Berkeley, before returning to Educational Testing Service.

He held the Frederic M. Lord Chair in Measurement and Statistics at the Educational Testing Service.

Selected publications
 Paul W. Holland & Samuel Leinhardt (editors) (1979) Perspectives on Social Network Research, Academic Press , proceedings on structural balance theory
 Holland, P. W. (1986) "Statistics and causal inference", Journal of the American Statistical Association 81(396): 945-960.
 Holland, P. W., & Welsch, R. E. (1977) "Robust regression using iteratively reweighted least-squares", Communications in Statistics-theory and Methods 6(9): 813-827.
 Holland, P. W., & Howard Wainer (editors) (2012) Differential Item Functioning. Routledge

References

American statisticians
1940 births
Living people
University of Michigan alumni
Stanford University alumni